Raja Pandi is a 1994 Indian Tamil-language action film, directed by Manoj Kumar and produced by Muktha Ravi. The film stars Sarathkumar, Sukanya, Vadivelu and Kasthuri. It was released on 9 September 1994.

Plot

Cast 
Sarathkumar
Sukanya
Vadivelu
Kasthuri
Senthil
Latha
K. R. Vijaya
Rajeev

Soundtrack 
The music was composed by Deva, with lyrics by Vairamuthu.

Reception 
Malini Mannath of The Indian Express wrote, "The director is not able to maintain the interest throughout the film". Thulasi of Kalki said the film has story within a story and that the film doesn't move a single bit from the old formula. He found Deva's music as melodious while appreciating editing as film's lifeline and he has worked hard to show story within a story without confusion but panned Sarathkumar's acting and Manojkumar's direction.

References

External links 
 

1990s masala films
1990s Tamil-language films
1994 action films
1994 films
Films scored by Deva (composer)
Indian action films